Shayne Moseley (born 11 April 1994) is a Barbadian cricketer. He made his international debut for the West Indies cricket team in February 2021.

Career
He made his first-class debut for Barbados in the 2017–18 Regional Four Day Competition on 26 October 2017. He made his List A debut for Barbados in the 2018–19 Regional Super50 tournament on 4 October 2018.

In June 2020, Moseley was named as one of eleven reserve players in the West Indies' Test squad, for their series against England. The Test series was originally scheduled to start in May 2020, but was moved back to July 2020 due to the COVID-19 pandemic. In December 2020, Moseley was named in the West Indies' Test squad for their series against Bangladesh. He made his Test debut for the West Indies, against Bangladesh, on 3 February 2021.

References

External links
 

1994 births
Living people
Barbadian cricketers
Barbados cricketers
West Indies Test cricketers
People from Christ Church, Barbados